Martin Myrone is lead curator, British art to 1800 at the Tate Gallery.

Selected publications
 With Jeff McMillan and Ruth Kenny, British Folk Art, exhibition catalogue, Tate Britain 2014, 144pp.
 John Martin: Apocalypse, exhibition catalogue, Tate Britain 2011, 240pp.
 “Something Too Academical”: The Problem with Etty’, in Sarah Burnage, Mark Hallett and Laura Turner (eds.), William Etty: Art & Controversy, exhibition catalogue, York Museums Trust 2011, pp. 47–59.
 ‘Instituting English Folk Art’, Visual Culture in Britain, vol.10, no.1, 2009, pp. 27–52.
 ‘The Body of the Blasphemer’, in Helen P. Bruder and Tristanne Connolly (eds.), Queer Blake, Basingstoke 2010, pp. 74–86.
 The Blake Book, London 2007, 224pp.
 William Blake: Seen in my Visions: A Descriptive Catalogue of Pictures, London 2009, 128pp.
 Gothic Nightmares: Fuseli, Blake and the Romantic Imagination, exhibition catalogue, Tate Britain, London 2006, 224pp.
 Bodybuilding: Reforming Masculinities in British Art, 1750–1810, New Haven and London 2005, 284pp.
 With Lucy Peltz (eds.), Producing the Past: Aspects of Antiquarian Culture and Practice 1700–1850, Aldershot 1999, 214pp.

References

External links 
Rude Britannia - Curator Martin Myrone introduces British Comic Art at Tate Britain.

Selected publications
 With Jeff McMillan and Ruth Kenny, British Folk Art, exhibition catalogue, Tate Britain 2014, 144pp.
 John Martin: Apocalypse, exhibition catalogue, Tate Britain 2011, 240pp.
 “Something Too Academical”: The Problem with Etty’, in Sarah Burnage, Mark Hallett and Laura Turner (eds.), William Etty: Art & Controversy, exhibition catalogue, York Museums Trust 2011, pp. 47–59.
 ‘Instituting English Folk Art’, Visual Culture in Britain, vol.10, no.1, 2009, pp. 27–52.
 ‘The Body of the Blasphemer’, in Helen P. Bruder and Tristanne Connolly (eds.), Queer Blake, Basingstoke 2010, pp. 74–86.
 The Blake Book, London 2007, 224pp.
 William Blake: Seen in my Visions: A Descriptive Catalogue of Pictures, London 2009, 128pp.
 Gothic Nightmares: Fuseli, Blake and the Romantic Imagination, exhibition catalogue, Tate Britain, London 2006, 224pp.
 Bodybuilding: Reforming Masculinities in British Art, 1750–1810, New Haven and London 2005, 284pp.
 With Lucy Peltz (eds.), Producing the Past: Aspects of Antiquarian Culture and Practice 1700–1850, Aldershot 1999, 214pp.

Living people
British art historians
British curators
Year of birth missing (living people)